Peter J. Nygård (born Pekka Juhani Nygård; born July 24, 1941) is a Finnish-Canadian fashion executive. In 1967, he founded Nygård International, a Winnipeg-based company that made women's apparel. In 2020, Nygård was accused of long-term sex trafficking, rape, and racketeering after the Federal Bureau of Investigation (FBI) raided his company's offices in New York City. Later that year, he was formally charged and was arrested on sex trafficking and racketeering charges, including allegations of sex trafficking involving minors. In October 2021, Nygård was charged by Toronto police with multiple counts of sexual assault and forcible confinement in incidents that occurred between the mid-1980s and mid-2000s; accusations of sexual misconduct by Nygård date as far back as 1968. As of September 2022, Nygård's criminal trials are ongoing and he has not been convicted of any crimes.

Early life 

Peter Nygård was born Pekka Juhani Nygård in Helsinki, Finland, on July 24, 1941. His parents emigrated to Deloraine, Manitoba, Canada, in 1952, when Nygård was around eleven years old. In 1964, Nygård graduated from the University of North Dakota with a business degree.

Nygård International

Nygård established Nygård Apparel Manufacturing Company, later rebranded Nygård International, in Winnipeg in 1967. The company's Canadian  headquarters were located on King Street in Toronto, Ontario, while its world headquarters were located in Times Square, New York, New York, United States. Times Square was also the location of Nygård's fashion concept retail store, which opened on Friday, November 6, 2009.

In February 2020, the headquarters of Nygård International was raided as part of a sex trafficking investigation against Nygård by the Federal Bureau of Investigation (FBI). The company filed for Chapter 15 bankruptcy in New York on March 18, 2020, and a Manitoba judge ordered a group of Nygård companies into receivership the following day. On April 30, a Canadian judge authorized an accounting firm to sell off part of the business.

2020 sex trafficking arrest and lawsuits 

On November 24, 2019, Bahamian police began investigating six allegations of rape made against Nygård. All the alleged victims were under 16. On January 27, 2020, Nygård faced two separate lawsuits after being accused of sexual assault. 

On February 13, 2020, 10 women filed a class-action lawsuit against Nygård in New York, alleging that he had raped them at his Bahamas residence. The alleged attacks took place between 2008 and 2015. The women also alleged that he maintained a sex-trafficking ring, and that seven of the women were under 18 when the attacks took place. 

On February 14, 2020, it was reported that the Bahamian police were investigating the allegations made by four of the women in the class-action suit. On February 25, 2020, the New York headquarters of Nygård International were raided by the FBI and the New York City Police Department in connection with sex trafficking claims. After these, Nygård announced that he would step down from the company and divest his ownership interest. In March 2020, a judge said that there was no evidence Nygård had actually resigned, and that he still owned 100% of the shares of the Nygård group of companies.

On April 20, 2020, 36 new women joined the class-action suit, bringing the total number of plaintiffs in the sexual assault case to 46. On June 17, 2020, it was reported that 11 more women had joined the class-action lawsuit, bringing the total number of plaintiffs to 57. On July 9, 2020, Nygard filed a motion to dismiss the claims of 52 of the plaintiffs, stating that "numerous deficiencies" barred their claims, and in particular that the claims of 50 of the plaintiffs lacked any connection to New York. He also argued that the statute of limitations had expired for 38 of the plaintiffs.

On August 17, 2020, Nygård was sued by two of his sons on accusations of directing a known sex worker said to be "his girlfriend" to rape them. On August 22, 2020, it was reported that the class-action suit had been placed on hold, the US government having requested a stay of proceedings while the criminal investigation was ongoing.

On December 15, 2020, it was reported that Nygård had been arrested in Winnipeg for extradition to the US to face charges of sex trafficking by the US attorney's office in Manhattan. On February 5, 2021, Nygård was denied bail and faced extradition to the US. 

On February 18, 2021, it was reported that a new lawsuit had been filed by one of the class-action plaintiffs, which named Peter Nygård's niece, Angela Dyborn, as an alleged co-conspirator in the alleged sex-trafficking scheme. On March 26, 2021, Nygård was denied bail for a second time. In April 2021 it was reported that Nygård would face an extradition hearing in November 2021.

On 1 October 2021, Peter Nygard agreed to be extradited to the US, to face the charges against him that were filed there. The same day Nygard was charged by Toronto police with six counts of sexual assault and three counts of forcible confinement.

On December 17, 2020, two days after Nygård's arrest, it was reported that Discovery+ was releasing a series about Peter Nygård's life entitled Unseamly: The Investigation of Peter Nygård. The documentary aired in February 2021, and included interviews with family members and former Nygård employees.

On January 25, 2021, CBC Podcasts released the first episode of their podcast, Evil by Design, about the allegations against Nygård. The podcast includes interviews with alleged victims. It was later adopted into a documentary series that appeared on CBC Gem. An episode of Dateline about the Nygard case also aired in December 2021.

Sexual abuse allegations 

In addition to his alleged sex trafficking ring, over the years Nygard has been accused numerous times of sexual abuse including rape, sexual assault and sexual harassment. 

 In 1968 Winnipeg police charged Nygard with a sexual offence, charges that were later dropped after his alleged victim refused to testify.
 In 1980, the Free Press wrote that Winnipeg police charged Nygård with the rape of an 18-year-old girl. Later those charges were stayed because the girl refused to testify. It was later claimed in a lawsuit that Nygård used funds from his companies to pay her off.
 In the 1990s Nygård settled sexual harassment complaints by three former employees in Manitoba.
 In 2015 and 2017, Nygård was looked at by FBI over claims of sex trafficking. He was also investigated by the United States Department of Homeland Security for 9 months in 2016.
 On 1 October 2021, Nygård was charged by Toronto police with six counts of sexual assault and three counts of forcible confinement.
On December 2, 2021 it was reported that Nygård would face charges by Winnipeg police following a ten month investigation into allegations of sexual assault from eight women against him.

Lawsuits

Nygård has been involved in numerous lawsuits before his arrest in 2020, including suits involving alleged abusive labour practices, tax evasion, and conspiring to murder
In 1978, Nygård's takeover of a sportswear designer's business in New York City led to a 12-year legal battle in New York federal court.
Nygård settled sexual harassment complaints by three former employees in Manitoba in the 1990s.
In 1999, Nygård sued Linda Lampenius for defamation concerning her comments about Nygård's parties with naked women. The case continued until 2001 when Lampenius states she ran out of funds and had to settle, which consisted of publishing an apology in the newspaper Ilta-Sanomat.
In 2003, Nygård was sued in Florida by an American couple who claimed he deceived them into accepting jobs as managers of his Bahamas estate. The case was settled in 2007.
In 2005, after Finnish newspaper Iltalehti published an article about sex parties at Nygård's mansion, even featuring a short interview with Jessica Alba where she had to leave a party at the Nygård Cay mansion (she was there filming Into the Blue) because of the debauchery with young girls going on. Nygård sued the parent company of the paper Alma Media for slander in Los Angeles. Nygård lost the case.
In 2006, Canadian tax authorities claimed Nygård underreported $15 million in taxes. Nygård argued that he severed residential ties with Canada in 1975; he was ultimately subject to taxes on an unreported $2 million.
In 2007, a dispute escalated into a battle royale encompassing no fewer than 16 legal actions between Nygård and Louis Bacon and their associates, in which both sides claim damages in the tens of millions of dollars and allegations of vandalism, bribery, insider trading, arson, murder, destruction of the fragile seabed, and having a close association with the Ku Klux Klan.
In 2008, Nygård was sued in Los Angeles Superior Court by a former girlfriend for slamming a door on her hand. Nygård quickly settled the lawsuit.
In 2012, Nygård launched a lawsuit against the CBC regarding copyright issues about private videos taken at his residence, which were then used in an April 2010 documentary. He had also launched a copyright complaint with the US District Court in New York and a lawsuit in Manitoba to prevent the piece from airing. He had previously sued two former employees for releasing confidential information and his lawyer claimed CBC harassed many of the employees. Nygård launched a civil suit against his neighbour and the Lyford Cay Property Owners Association alleging they conspired with the CBC to damage his reputation; he also filed a private criminal prosecution against three CBC journalists accusing them of conspiring to discredit him and his clothing empire.
In 2018, Nygård Cay was seized by the Supreme Court of the Bahamas as part of a legal battle surrounding Nygård's efforts to dredge the sea floor around the estate.
In 2019, a warrant was issued after Nygård failed to appear in court multiple times for a sentencing hearing related to two contempt-of-court convictions in the Bahamas.
In September 2019, the New York Times was caught up in the feud between Nygård and Louis Bacon. The suit claims that the reporters for the paper "tried to steer the individuals to provide information to fit a story" and that reporters wanted to "bring down" Nygård.
On November 15, 2019, a judge in the Bahamas sentenced Nygård to 90 days in prison and fined him $150,000 after finding he breached a court order prohibiting the disclosure of emails that were stolen from a non-profit group. Nygård subsequently paid the fine, but appealed against the contempt order, and obtained a stay of execution of the prison sentence until his appeal was heard. On February 1, 2021, Nygård's appeal against the contempt order was dismissed by the Court of Appeal of the Bahamas. On February 4, 2021, Nygård filed a motion requesting leave to appeal to the Privy Council, but the Court of Appeal of the Bahamas refused to grant this. The judge who delivered the refusal stated that Nygård could still apply directly to the Privy Council for leave to appeal.

Feud with Louis Bacon

In 2005, Nygård attempted to solve a parking overflow problem at Nygård Cay by installing a large concrete slab on Louis Bacon's property. Bacon sought and obtained a court injunction to remove it. In 2007, Bacon, annoyed by noise at Nygård's house, installed industrial-grade speakers at the edge of his property and pointed them at Nygård's house. 

In the summer of 2010, Bacon's house was raided by Bahamian police, leading to the confiscation of the speakers. Bacon claimed it was the work of Nygård, a claim he denied. Vanity Fair reported that Nygård also used fake news sites to smear Bacon as running a drug-smuggling operation, as a member of the KKK, having been charged with insider trading, and being involved in murdering the Point House caretaker. In January 2015, Bacon filed a defamation lawsuit against Nygård over these claims. In January 2021, Savvy Media Holdings acquired the rights to a couple of books relating to Nygård's feud with Louis Bacon, to make a feature film. Justin Lader was chosen to write the film.

Nygård Cay

In 1984, he purchased a beach bungalow for $1.76 million. In 1987 Nygård built a  compound at Lyford Cay in the Bahamas. On April 14, 2010, Nygård announced he was planning a $50-million renovation of Nygård Cay, which would take two years to complete and repair the damage and employ 200 construction workers. 

A letter from the Bahamian prime minister's office rejected his construction application, citing the improper expansion of his property through intentional accretion of land over the seabed. On September 28, 2018, Nygård Cay was seized by the Supreme Court of the Bahamas as part of a legal battle surrounding Nygård’s efforts to dredge the sea floor around the estate. In 2021 the property is in a general state of disrepair.

Personal life

Nygård has ten children with eight women. Nygård has been a longtime sponsor of amateur sports in the Bahamas. In June 2010, he was the main sponsor of the Amateur Boxing Federation of the Bahamas team for Continental Elite Boxing Championships, an invitation-only event in Quito, Ecuador.

On December 15, 2020, Nygård was arrested in Winnipeg, Canada, under the Extradition Act.  he was in jail awaiting extradition proceedings, and a potential extradition to the US.

Honours

In 2012, Nygård was awarded a Queen Elizabeth II Diamond Jubilee Medal.

In 2002, Deloraine, Manitoba where Nygård grew up, unveiled a commemorative plaque and named a park in his honour. In May 2020, the park’s name was changed to Prairie Sentinels Park, after Nygård was arrested under charges of sex trafficking and rape.

Notes

References

 
1941 births
Living people
Canadian businesspeople
Canadian expatriates in the Bahamas
Canadian people of Finnish descent
Finnish emigrants to Canada
Naturalized citizens of Canada
People from Deloraine, Manitoba
Businesspeople from Helsinki
Businesspeople from Winnipeg
University of North Dakota alumni
Life extensionists
Corruption in the Bahamas
People charged with sex trafficking
People charged with racketeering
Canadian prisoners and detainees
Finnish prisoners and detainees
People named in the Paradise Papers